Mount Blane may refer to:

Mount Blane (Alberta)
Mount Blane (British Columbia)